Matthew Goodyear (born 20 July 1996) is a former professional Australian rules footballer who last played for the Collingwood Football Club in the Australian Football League (AFL). Matthew is now a current committed American Football Punter for Fresno State University in the NCAA Mountain West Conference.

Goodyear made his debut against St Kilda in Round 3, 2016.

In 2016, he played two senior games for Collingwood and he was delisted at the end of the season.

Statistics

|- style="background-color: #eaeaea"
! scope="row" style="text-align:center" | 2015
|  || 38 || 0 || — || — || — || — || — || — || — || — || — || — || — || — || — || —
|- 
! scope="row" style="text-align:center" | 2016
|  || 27 || 2 || 0 || 1 || 10 || 8 || 18 || 5 || 2 || 0.0 || 0.5 || 5.0 || 4.0 || 9.0 || 2.5 || 1.0
|- class="sortbottom"
! colspan=3| Career
! 2
! 0
! 1
! 10
! 8
! 18
! 5
! 2
! 0.0
! 0.5
! 5.0
! 4.0
! 9.0
! 2.5
! 1.0
|}

References

External links

Living people
1996 births
Collingwood Football Club players
Calder Cannons players
Australian rules footballers from Victoria (Australia)